The Marine Mill, established in 1839, was the first commercial sawmill in what became the U.S. state of Minnesota.  Now in ruins, it is currently a historic site managed by the city of Marine on St. Croix in partnership with the Minnesota Historical Society.  It was listed on the National Register of Historic Places as the Marine Mill Site in 1970 for having state-level significance in the themes of exploration/settlement, industry, and transportation.  It was nominated for being the birthplace of the region's seminal industry—lumbering—and a major landing on its crucial transportation route, the St. Croix River.  The site is also a contributing property to the Marine on St. Croix Historic District.

Operational history
Lewis Judd and David Hone identified the site, with a swift-flowing stream for power and a bank suitable for steamboats, as ideal for a sawmill during an 1838 scouting expedition.  They were members of a group of New Englanders who had come west in search of new lumbering opportunities.  They returned to their home base in Marine, Illinois, and chartered the Marine Lumber Company with six other business partners.  In May 1839 the eight partners, plus one member's wife and two children, arrived by steamboat with a load of milling machinery.  In just 90 days they had completed their sawmill, cutting lumber for the first time on August 24.  The land, only purchased by the United States in 1837 through treaties with the Ojibwe and Dakota people, was not yet legally open to settlement.

However the whole building burned down in a fire in September 1863, idling workers for three years until a replacement was constructed in 1866.

The mill, then known as the Walker, Judd, and Veazie Mill, was at its most profitable in the early 1870s. However a widespread economic depression triggered by the Panic of 1873, delays caused by a series of log jams on the river, and the valley's dwindling lumber supply soon changed that, and the mill went bankrupt in 1885. Various attempts to reopen the mill failed, and the business was dismantled in 1895.

Later history
The Marine Mill site lay abandoned for nearly 70 years.  It wasn't until 1964 that a resource commission recommended acquiring the land as a historic site.  No action was taken until a local committee formed in 1970 to advocate for preservation, and the following year the Minnesota Legislature appropriated funds to buy the site.  The local committee also cleared decades of revegetation, uncovering the foundations of support structures.  The land acquisition was completed in 1972 and the property transferred to the Minnesota Historical Society.

Description

In addition to the sawmill there was a planing mill, storage sheds, the steamboat levee, and piles of cut lumber, shingles, and laths. Between 1888 and 1895 all the wooden buildings were dismantled and the machinery sold off. All that remained were the stone walls of the 1873 sawmill and its water wheel. Today a historical marker stands by the entrance to the property, and an open lawn leads to an overlook of the sawmill ruins. A short interpretive trail leads past the faint foundations of two other mill complex buildings. The stream that powered the mill still runs through the site.

See also
 List of watermills in the United States
 National Register of Historic Places listings in Washington County, Minnesota

References

External links
 

1839 establishments in Iowa Territory
1895 disestablishments in the United States
Individually listed contributing properties to historic districts on the National Register in Minnesota
Industrial buildings and structures on the National Register of Historic Places in Minnesota
Industrial buildings completed in 1839
Industrial buildings completed in 1852
Industrial buildings completed in 1866
Industrial buildings completed in 1873
Logging in the United States
Minnesota Historical Society
Minnesota state historic sites
National Register of Historic Places in Washington County, Minnesota
Protected areas of Washington County, Minnesota
Ruins in the United States
Sawmills in the United States
Watermills in the United States